Idactus exiguus is a species of beetle of the family Cerambycidae. It was described by Quedenfeldt in 1891.

References

Ancylonotini
Beetles described in 1891